Marina Smorodina (born 7 April 1966) is a Soviet rower. She competed in the women's coxless pair event at the 1988 Summer Olympics.

References

1966 births
Living people
Soviet female rowers
Olympic rowers of the Soviet Union
Rowers at the 1988 Summer Olympics
Place of birth missing (living people)